Lawrence R. Gibson (September 15, 1912 – February 2, 2004) was an American politician and businessman.

Born in La Crosse, Wisconsin, Gibson went to University of Minnesota and University of Wisconsin–La Crosse. Gibson was a designer supervisor and was secretary and director of the Trane Employees Credit Union. From 1952 to 1955, Gibson served on the La Crosse Common Council and the Mary E. Sawyer Auditorium Board. In 1973, Gibson served in the Wisconsin State Assembly and was a Republican.

Notes

1912 births
2004 deaths
Politicians from La Crosse, Wisconsin
University of Minnesota alumni
University of Wisconsin–La Crosse alumni
Businesspeople from Wisconsin
Wisconsin city council members
20th-century American politicians
20th-century American businesspeople
Republican Party members of the Wisconsin State Assembly